Dadallah Noor Mohamed Al-Bulushi (born August 17, 1958 in Makran) is an Omani sport shooter. Al-Bulushi was one of sixteen athletes, including his brother Abdul Latif, who made the nation's official debut at the 1984 Summer Olympics in Los Angeles, where he competed in two rifle shooting events. He placed forty-ninth in the 50 m rifle prone, with a total score of 582 points, tying his position with three other shooters including Israel's Itzhak Yonassi. Few days later, he competed for his second event, 50 m rifle 3 positions, where he was able to shoot 387 targets in a prone position, 341 in kneeling, and 322 in standing, for an overall total score of 1,050 points, finishing only in fiftieth place.

Twenty-four years after competing in his first Olympics, Al-Bulushi qualified for his second Omani team as a 49-year-old at the 2008 Summer Olympics in Beijing by receiving an additional place in rifle shooting. He placed fifty-first in the 50 m rifle prone, by one target ahead of Cuba's Eliécer Pérez from the final attempt, with a total score of 582 points. For being the most experienced team member, Al-Bulushi also became Oman's flag bearer at the opening ceremony.

References

External links
 
NBC Olympics Profile

Omani male sport shooters
Living people
Olympic shooters of Oman
Shooters at the 1984 Summer Olympics
Shooters at the 2008 Summer Olympics
1958 births
Shooters at the 1994 Asian Games
Shooters at the 2002 Asian Games
Shooters at the 2006 Asian Games
Shooters at the 2010 Asian Games
Asian Games competitors for Oman
20th-century Omani people
21st-century Omani people